The Julie N. is a Liberian tanker that was involved in an oil spill occurring on the Fore River on 27 September 1996 in Portland, Maine.

Accident
To get to the docking station the ship had to pass through a narrow channel between the two sides of the Million Dollar Bridge while the movable span of the bridge was raised.

The official accident report cites that the ship operator directed crew members to steer to the port side (left), while he meant for the ship to be driven in the starboard direction (right). What resulted from the miscommunication between the crew of the Julie N. was that the ship drove into the right side of the Million Dollar Bridge. Oil instantly surged into the Fore River, with winds and ocean currents sending the oil upstream into marshes and estuaries. Over  of petroleum spewed from the hull of the Julie N. into the local environment.

Cleanup
Local and state authorities quickly responded to the disaster with the Maine Department of Environmental Protection assuming command of the clean up process. Although the spill was contained relatively early in the incident, miles of coastline and marsh were coated with oil. The process of cleaning up took several days and cost 43 million dollars. The oil spill occurring in the Fore River did not have as many environmental consequences as initially assumed. Wildlife remained safe for the most part, as few animals died or were seriously injured as a result of the spill, although the Maine DEP recorded approximately 1600 soiled birds. Flushing and hot water techniques were used to clean out the intricate estuaries upstream of the Fore River.  The clean up efforts were mostly successful as almost 80 percent of the toxins entering the bay from the Julie N. were recovered.

Effects and aftermath
An estimated  of petroleum were unable to be cleaned up and traces of oil can still be found in region dating back to this disaster. Regardless of this fact, wildlife now flourishes in the areas once engrossed in chemicals. The spill had a significant impact upon the local economy as Maine lobster and fish prices lowered due to national media coverage of the oil spill. Furthermore, several thousand lobster traps had to be replaced due to oil contamination.

The Million Dollar Bridge sustained only minor damage that did not affect its structural integrity. While the limited horizontal span of the bridge was partially to blame for the accident, the new Casco Bay Bridge was under construction during the time and was opened for traffic the following year. The new Bridge has a significantly larger horizontal span and has more sophisticated pile protection for ship collisions.

References

1996 in the environment
1996 in Maine
Environment of Maine
Oil spills in the United States